37th meridian may refer to:

37th meridian east, a line of longitude east of the Greenwich Meridian
37th meridian west, a line of longitude west of the Greenwich Meridian